Dirk Cornelis "Dick" Elffers (Rotterdam, 9 December 1910 – Amsterdam, 17 June 1990) was a Dutch artist.

Life 
Elffers was trained at the Academie voor Beeldende Kunsten (Rotterdam) as graphic designer. He developed into a versatile artist: illustrator, painter, printmaker, book binding designer, sculptor, ceramist and photographer. Besides performer from 1970 to 1976 he was lecturer in monumental art at the AKV St. Joost in 's-Hertogenbosch. Elffers received the State Award for Typography for his typographic work. Elffers' work is included in the collection of the Joods Historisch Museum. Elffers was also involved as a designer at the Rijksmuseum Amsterdam, both in the graphic design of the museum and the exhibit design. 

Elffers' work was included in the 1939 exhibition and sale Onze Kunst van Heden (Our Art of Today) at the Rijksmuseum in Amsterdam.

Family 
Dick Elffers was the son of Gerard Elffers (1868–1941) and Petronella Smits (1870–1912). He had ten brothers and sisters. His brother Kees was an architect, his sister Jo interior designer. Dick was married in 1941 with the photographer Emmy Andriesse (1914–1953), and remarried in 1954 Mien Harmsen (1915–2000). He is the father of writer, artist and illustrator Joost Elffers.

See also 
 List of Dutch ceramists
 List of Dutch sculptors

References

External links 

 Elffers, Dick at capriolus.nl 
 Work of Elffers in the Moma collection.

1910 births
1990 deaths
Dutch ceramists
Dutch designers
Dutch sculptors
Dutch male sculptors
People from Leiderdorp
20th-century ceramists